This is a list of notable universities in Lesotho.

 Botho University
 Lerotholi Polytechnic
 Limkokwing University of Creative Technology
 National University of Lesotho

See also

 Education in Lesotho
 List of schools in Lesotho

Universities
Universities
Lesotho
Lesotho